Little Heroes is the debut studio album by Australian rock and pop band Little Heroes. The album was released in August 1981 and peaked at number 81.

Background and release
Little Heroes were formed with the remnants of a band called The Secret Police, following some personnel changes in 1979. In 1980, Little Heroes competed in the Victorian State heat of the 1980 Battle of the Sounds, finishing second, progressing to the national final which they ultimately won, winning $5000 in  prize money. This led to the recording of the band's debut self-titled debut album.

Track listing

Charts

References

Little Heroes (band) albums
1981 debut albums